The Essential Mike Oldfield is a live concert video by Mike Oldfield.  It was recorded live at the Knebworth Festival on 21 June 1980 in front of 45,000 people and the interviews are in Oldfield's studio.  It was released on Laserdisc and VHS in 1980.

Track listing 
Written by Mike Oldfield, except "Sailor's Hornpipe", Traditional
 Beginning
 Interview part 1
 "Guilty"
 Interview part 2
 "Tubular Bells part 1"
 Interview part 3
 "Tubular Bells part 2" (including The Sailor's Hornpipe) 
 Interview part 4
 "Ommadawn part 1"
 End credits

References 

Mike Oldfield video albums
1980 live albums
1980 video albums
Live video albums
Virgin Records video albums